Tayane Porfírio de Araújo (born 11 December 1994 in Sobral, Ceará, Brazil)  is a Brazilian Jiu Jitsu (BJJ) 4x World Championship black belt champion. In 2017 Porfirio realized a "BJJ Grand Slam" after winning her weight category and the absolute category at all 4 major Gi Championships: World Championship, European Open Championship, Pan Jiu-Jitsu Championship and Brazilian Nationals Championship.

Career 
Tayane Porfírio de Araújo was born on 11 December 1994 in Sobral, Ceará, Brazil. She began training in 2010 at Mestre Márcio Rodrigues academy. In 2014 she moved to train with Mestre Alexandre Paiva at Alliance Jiu Jitsu in Rio de Janeiro. She started 2018 winning the 2018 European Open Championship in both her weight category and the absolute category. Porfirio missed the 2018 Pan Ams but came back after a slight injury to win her category and the absolute at the 2018 Brazilian Nationals.  Porfírio then won her category and the absolute at the 2018 World Championships. Porfirio ended 2018 as the number one black belt female competitor in the International Brazilian Jiu-Jitsu Federation rankings. 

In October 2019 Porfirio won a bronze medal at the 2019 ADCC Submission Wrestling World Championship. In 2019 Porfirio announced leaving team Alliance In Brazil, with whom she had been since blue belt, to join Gracie Barra In The UK. Porfirio also competed at BJJ Bet 2 on August 1, 2021, where she defeated Gabrieli Pessanha 2-0 on points.

Doping ban 
In May 2019, Porfirio received a four-year competition ban from the USADA (United States Anti-Doping Agency) after she tested positive for Nandrolone, a prohibited substance found in samples, collected on 3 June 2018, during the 2018 IBJJF World Jiu-Jitsu Championship. Porfirio’s four-year period of ineligibility began on 22 June 2018, in addition, Porfirio has been disqualified from all competitive results subsequent to 30 May 2018. Porfirio accepted the sanction while maintaining her innocence and the innocence of her team.

2023
Porfirio returned to IBJJF competition for the first time since being suspended in 2018 at the London Open on February 19, 2023, where she won the absolute division after submitting all her opponents, and default gold in the super heavyweight division.

Brazilian Jiu-Jitsu competitive summary 
Main Achievements at black belt level:

 IBJJF World champion (2018) (disqualified)
 IBJJF World Championship (2017)
 IBJJF European Open (2018) / 2017))
 IBJJF Pan American Championship (2017)
 CBJJ Brazilian Nationals (2018) / 2017))

Main Achievements (Coloured Belts):

 IBJJF World Championship (2015) purple, 2016 brown)
 UAEJJF Abu Dhabi World Pro (2016) brown)
 IBJJF Pan American (2017, 2015) purple)
 IBJJF European Open (2015) purple, 2016) brown)
 CBJJ Brazilian Nationals (2014)/2015) purple)
 UAEJJF Grand Slam – London (2016) brown)
 UAEJJF Grand Slam – Rio de Janeiro (2016) brown)
 3rd Place IBJJF World Championship (2016) brown)

Instructor lineage 
Mitsuyo Maeda > Carlos Gracie > Helio Gracie > Rolls Gracie > Romero Cavalcanti > Alexandre Paiva > Tayane Porfirio

Notes

References 

Brazilian practitioners of Brazilian jiu-jitsu
Living people
1994 births
People awarded a black belt in Brazilian jiu-jitsu
Brazilian jiu-jitsu world champions (women)
People from Sobral, Ceará
Sportspeople from Ceará
Doping cases in Brazilian jiu-jitsu